Colchester Town railway station is on the Sunshine Coast Line in the East of England, and is the secondary station serving the city of Colchester, Essex. Its three-letter station code is CET. The city's larger station is called  (also known as Colchester North station to distinguish it) and is on the Great Eastern Main Line but is further away from the city centre.

The station was opened in 1866 by the Tendring Hundred Railway, a subsidiary of the Great Eastern Railway, as St. Botolph's, after the nearby priory and church that gave their name to this part of the city. It was renamed Colchester Town in 1991. It is currently operated by Greater Anglia, which also runs all trains serving the station.

 there is only one platform. Since a Magistrates Court was built the station size has decreased, losing its car park and talks of adding an extra platform have been halted. To the east of the station, Colne Junction is the western extremity of a triangle which gives access towards Colchester station to the west and Hythe station to the east. The curve to the north from Colne Junction to East Gates Junction is sharp, with a continuous check rail which necessitates slow passage.

Services
The following services typically call at Colchester Town during the off-peak:

2 trains per hour (tph) to Colchester only;

Colchester Town is closed on Sundays, except during December when an hourly service operates to Walton-on-the-Naze. If engineering work on a Sunday closes Colchester station, Colchester Town is opened as an alternative.

References

External links 

Railway stations in Essex
DfT Category E stations
Former Great Eastern Railway stations
Railway stations in Great Britain opened in 1866
Greater Anglia franchise railway stations
Buildings and structures in Colchester (town)
Transport in Colchester
1866 establishments in England